Newworldson is the self-titled second album from Canadian Christian soul band Newworldson.
The album surpassed the band's previous effort, Salvation Station, in chart positions, peaking at No. 8 on the Billboard Heatseekers chart and No. 15 on the Billboard Christian albums chart. It was nominated for a 2011 Juno Award in the category of Contemporary Christian/Gospel Album of the Year.

Track listing

Personnel
 Joel Parisien - vocals, keyboards 
 Joshua Franklin Toal - guitar, vocals 
 Rich Moore - bass, vocals 
 Mark Rogers - drums

References

2010 albums
Newworldson albums